Dalmia may refer to:

Organizations

 Dalmia Group, an Indian conglomerate
 N. L. Dalmia Institute of Management Studies and Research, an educational institute in Mumbai, India
 Dalmia Dharamsala, a resthouse in Odisha, India

People

 Dinesh Nandini Dalmia, Indian Hindi-language writer
 Himani Dalmia, Indian writer
 Jagmohan Dalmiya, cricket administrator
 Jaidayal Dalmia, Indian businessman
 Ritu Dalmia, Indian chef and restaurateur
 Sanjay Dalmia, Indian businessman
 Vishnu Hari Dalmia, Indian businessman